My Brother's Keeper is the debut album by hip-hop artist Lake, also known as Lakey the Kid. It was released on August 22, 2006. Fellow Queensbridge hip-hop artist Cormega is featured heavily on the album. The first single from the album was "The Oath" which was performed by both Lake and Cormega.

Track listing

References

External links
 My Brother's Keeper (2006) AllMusic Overview 
 My Brother's Keeper (2006) Rate Your Music Review

2006 albums
Cormega albums
albums produced by DJ Premier